William Koskei  (born 28 December 1947) was a Kenyan track and field athlete who specialised in the 400 metres hurdles and 4 × 400 metres relay.

Biography
Koskei trained in Uganda early in his career and won a silver medal for his adopted country in the 400 metres hurdles at the 1970 British Commonwealth Games.

His appearance at the 1972 Summer Olympics came after he switched allegiances back to his native Kenya. He competed in the 400 metres hurdles where he was eliminated following his first heat, which he finished in fourth position.

He won further 400 metres hurdles medals over the next two years, a silver at the 1973 All-Africa Games and a bronze at the 1974 British Commonwealth Games in Christchurch. At the 1974 British Commonwealth Games he was also a member of Kenya's gold medal winning 4 × 400 metres relay team.

He won another gold medal with the 4 × 400 metres relay team at the 1978 Commonwealth Games.

See also
List of Commonwealth Games medallists in athletics (men)
List of African Games medalists in athletics (men)

References

External links
Bill Koskei at Sports-Reference

1947 births
Living people
Ugandan male sprinters
Kenyan male sprinters
Ugandan male hurdlers
Kenyan male hurdlers
Olympic male hurdlers
Olympic athletes of Kenya
Athletes (track and field) at the 1972 Summer Olympics
Commonwealth Games gold medallists for Kenya
Commonwealth Games bronze medallists for Kenya
Commonwealth Games silver medallists for Uganda
Commonwealth Games gold medallists in athletics
Commonwealth Games medallists in athletics
Athletes (track and field) at the 1970 British Commonwealth Games
Athletes (track and field) at the 1974 British Commonwealth Games
Athletes (track and field) at the 1978 Commonwealth Games
African Games silver medalists for Kenya
African Games medalists in athletics (track and field)
Athletes (track and field) at the 1973 All-Africa Games
Medallists at the 1974 British Commonwealth Games
Medallists at the 1978 Commonwealth Games